General elections are scheduled to be held in Sudan in July 2023. A constitutional convention is expected to be held before the end of the transitional period to draft a permanent constitution that should define the form of government and electoral system.

Constitutional ineligibility constraint
Article 19 of the August 2019 Draft Constitutional Declaration forbids "the chairman and members of the Sovereignty Council and ministers, governors of provinces, or heads of regions" from running "in the public elections" planned for late 2022. Article 38.(c)(iv) of the declaration states that the chair and members of the Elections Commission are to be appointed by the Sovereignty Council in consultation with the Cabinet.

October 2021 coup

A coup was launched by military forces on October 24, 2021, which resulted in the arrests of at least five senior Sudanese government figures. Widespread Internet outages were also reported. It is not currently clear as to what impact this will have on the planned election. Abdalla Hamdok, the Prime Minister, was among those who were arrested and was held in an undisclosed location.

On November 21, 2021, Hamdok, and all those that were arrested in the October coup were freed as Hamdok was reinstated as Prime Minister as part of an agreement with the civilian political parties. The agreement also allowed Hamdok to lead the transitional government.

On December 4, 2021, General Abdel Fattah al-Burhan who led the coup, told Reuters in an interview that the Sudanese military will "exit politics" following the elections stating, "When a government is elected, I don't think the army, the armed forces, or any of the security forces will participate in politics. This is what we agreed on and this is the natural situation."

On January 2, 2022, Hamdok resigned as Prime Minister following violent protests in Khartoum that left fifty-seven people dead. The military assumed full control of the transition process. Hamdok, in a televised address, stated he had tried his best to stop the country from "sliding towards disaster" and "despite everything that has been done to reach a consensus... it has not happened."

References

Sudan
Sudan
2023
2023
General election